Laura Sugar  (born 7 February 1991) is a British Paralympic athlete who competes in sprint events under the T44 classification. Before taking up athletics Sugar represented Wales at field hockey captaining the under-20s team. She has now switched to canoeing.

Personal career
Sugar was born in Saffron Walden, England in 1991. She was born with talipes (club foot), which meant her foot was turned in. Sugar underwent surgery to correct
the problem as a baby, but it left her with no movement in her ankle. She was educated at Newport Free Grammar before matriculating to the University of Leeds where she studied sports science. She followed this with a Postgraduate Certificate in Education to qualify as a secondary school teacher. She took up a position at Ashby School as a PE teacher, but left her position in 2015 to focus on her athletics training.

Hockey career
Sugar took up field hockey while attending Newport Free Grammar, starting at the age of 12. She played as a youth for Saffron Walden, Cambridgeshire and was selected for trials for the East of England squad. This brought her to the attention of Hockey Wales who successfully recruited her to the Welsh youth squad due to her father's Welsh roots. She first played for Wales at the age of 17, and progressed through the age groups until she reached the senior levels, captaining the Wales under-20s which Sugar described as "one of my proudest moments through hockey".

Athletics career
During her hockey training the team's physio commented on Sugar's ankle impairment, stating that she should try out a Paralympic sport as she would be able to gain a classification. While watching the 2012 Summer Paralympics she noticed that the British discus thrower, Dan Greaves appeared to have "the same leg", and Sugar decided to explore her physio's advice. She attended a Paralympic sport's festival in Surrey and after considering cycling and athletics she decided to follow the latter. In February 2013 she had her first athletics trial and was informed that she would be flown out to Dubai in four weeks to be classified before competing at the Fazaa International, an IPC Grand Prix event. At the Grand Prix she ran in the 100m and 200m sprints, winning a silver and gold medal. Now a T44 classification athlete, Sugar had to decide on whether to continue her hockey career or switch to track and field. She chose athletics and spent the next ten months committing all her time outside of her teaching to her new training regime.

Sugar's first major international competition came in July 2013 when she was selected as part of the Great Britain team to compete at the 2013 IPC Athletics World Championships in Lyon. In the Women's 100m (T44) she came through the heats to finish fifth in the finals. In the 200m she finished fourth, just outside a podium finish. The following year she won her first international medals, collecting two bronze medals at the 2014 IPC Athletics European Championships in Swansea, in the 100m and 200m sprints. During 2014 and 2015 Sugar also entered long jump events. Her most notable result being at the European Championships in Swansea where she came fourth with a distance of 4.27 metres.

In the build-up to the 2016 Summer Paralympics in Rio, Sugar travelled to Doha to compete at her second World Championships. She was selected by the Great Britain management to co-captain the team, along with middle-distance runner Paul Blake. Sugar only competed in the 100 metres event, and her time of 14.86, way outside her personal best, was not enough to get her through the heats. The following year brought a return to success with two medals at the 2016 IPC Athletics European Championships in Grosseto. She won a bronze in the 200m and a silver in the 200m, just a tenth of a second behind the winner Irmgard Bensusan of Germany. In July Sugar was confirmed as a member of the Great Britain team to compete at the Rio Paralympics.

Sugar was appointed Member of the Order of the British Empire (MBE) in the 2022 New Year Honours for services to canoeing.

References

Living people
People from Saffron Walden
English female sprinters
Track and field athletes with disabilities
Sportswomen with disabilities
Paralympic athletes of Great Britain
English people with disabilities
British disabled sportspeople
Alumni of the University of Leeds
People educated at Newport Free Grammar School
1991 births
Athletes (track and field) at the 2016 Summer Paralympics
Paracanoeists at the 2020 Summer Paralympics
Medalists at the 2020 Summer Paralympics
Paracanoeists of Great Britain
Members of the Order of the British Empire
Paralympic gold medalists for Great Britain